Annabelle is a Swiss women's fashion magazine published in German language. The magazine also covers feminist issues and initiated several campaigns about improving women's social status. It is called the Marie Claire of Switzerland. Its headquarters is in Zurich.

History and profile
Annabelle was established in 1938, and the first issue was published on 1 March 1938. The idea to launch Annabelle was developed by the publishers Karl von Schumacher and Manuel Gasser. The founder and the launching editor was Mabel Zuppinger, an Austrian woman living in Zurich. She edited the magazine until 1959.

The magazine was part of and published by Tamedia until October 2019 when it was sold to Medienart. It was published monthly, later increasing its frequency to weekly. The target audience of the magazine is women living in German-speaking Switzerland.

Although Annabelle is a women's fashion magazine, it also has a long history of covering political and social issues, including feminism. Initially, the magazine was a regular publication for housewives. During the 1940s and 1960s it covered articles on the growing consumer industry and at the same time it supported the education of girls. In the next decade it extensively featured articles related to the problems of working women as well as divorce and sex-related problems. In the 1980s the magazine specifically targeted young, active, and energetic women who were emancipated, but feminine.

Annabelle also deals with the status of women living in other regions, featuring articles concerning the sexuality of women in the Arab world and honour killing in Albania. In 2006 the magazine launched a petition, "No weapons at home", to support for a ban on shotguns at home. The magazine campaigned for a 30 percent increase in the number of women in the boardrooms of Swiss companies in 2013. The same year Tamedia, the parent company of the magazine, banned it from reporting political events, such as the emancipation of women, that might cause social unrest. The magazine also publishes interviews with significant figures, including Federal Councillor Simonetta Sommaruga.

From 2004 to 2013 Lisa Feldmann was the editor-in-chief of Annabelle. She was replaced by Silvia Binggeli in the post. Since July 2019 Jacqueline Krause-Blouin assumes the editor-in-chief position.

Annabelle has a travel supplement, ReiseNews, which is published five times a year.

Circulation
Annabelle had a circulation of 71,292 copies in 2010, 71,445 copies in 2011 and 70,178 copies in 2012. In 2015 the magazine sold 66,121 copies. The 2016 circulation of the magazine decreased to 51,255 copies.

References

External links

1938 establishments in Switzerland
Feminism in Switzerland
Feminist magazines
German-language magazines
Magazines established in 1938
Magazines published in Zürich
Monthly magazines published in Switzerland
Political magazines published in Switzerland
Weekly magazines published in Switzerland
Women's fashion magazines
Women's magazines published in Switzerland